Manon Steffan Ros (born 19 January 1983) is a Welsh novelist, playwright, games author, scriptwriter and musician (being one half of the acoustic duo 'Blodau Gwylltion'). She is the author of over twenty children's books and three novels for adults, all in Welsh. Her award-winning novel Blasu has been translated (by the author) into English, under the title of The Seasoning. In May 2021 she was described as "arguably the most successful novelist writing in Welsh at the moment".

Biography 

Ros was born in Rhiwlas to musician Steve Eaves. She attended Ysgol Rhiwlas and Ysgol Dyffryn Ogwen in Bethesda. She lives in Tywyn.

She is twice winner of the Drama Medal for playwrights at the National Eisteddfod of Wales and won the Prose Medal in 2018. In June 2017, she won the prestigious Tir na n-Og Award for the third time, in the primary school category, presented by the Welsh Books Council to honour the year's best Welsh-language book. 

She won the Prose Medal at the National Eisteddfod 2018, for her work Llyfr Glas Nebo, written under her nom de plume Aleloia.

Awards 
2005 and 2006 National Eisteddfod's Drama Medal; 
2010, 2012, 2017 and 2019 Welsh-language Tir na n-Og Award;
 2018 Prose Medal at the National Eisteddfod of Wales for Llyfr Glas Nebo.

Bibliography 
 Trwy'r Darlun, Cyfres yr Onnen (Y Lolfa, 2008)
 Fel Aderyn (Y Lolfa, 2009)
 Trwy'r Tonnau, Cyfres yr Onnen (Y Lolfa, 2009)
 Bwystfilod a Bwganod, Cyfres yr Onnen (Y Lolfa, 2010)
 Prism, Cyfres yr Onnen (Y Lolfa, 2011)
 Hunllef, Stori Sydyn (Y Lolfa, 2012)
 Blasu (Y Lolfa, 2012), adapted for English as The Seasoning (Honno Press, 2015)
 Inc, Stori Sydyn (Y Lolfa, 2013)
 Baba Hyll (Y Lolfa, 2013)
 Dafydd a Dad (Y Lolfa, 2013)
 Llanw (Y Lolfa, 2014)
 Al, Cyfres Copa (Y Lolfa, 2014)
 Y Dyn Gwyrdd a'r Coed Teg, Cyfres Cloch (Gwasg Carreg Gwalch, 2014)
 Diffodd y Golau, Cyfres y Geiniog, adapted for English as Turn Out the Light, The Penny Series (Canolfan Peniarth, 2015)
 Annwyl Mr Rowlands, Cyfres y Geiniog, adapted to English as Dear Mr Rowlands, The Penny Series (Canolfan Peniarth, 2015)
 Two Faces (Y Lolfa, 2016), adapted for Welsh by Elin Meek (Canolfan Peniarth, 2018)
 Pluen (Y Lolfa, 2016)
 Golygon (Y Lolfa, 2017)
 Y Stelciwr, Stori Sydyn (Y Lolfa, 2017)
 Sara Sero, Cyfres Cymeriadau Difyr (Canolfan Peniarth, 2018)
 Alun Un, Cyfres Cymeriadau Difyr (Canolfan Peniarth, 2018)
 Deio Dau, Cyfres Cymeriadau Difyr (Canolfan Peniarth, 2018)
 Twm Tri, Cyfres Cymeriadau Difyr (Canolfan Peniarth, 2018)
 Pedr Pedwar, Cyfres Cymeriadau Difyr (Canolfan Peniarth, 2018)
 Poli Pump, Cyfres Cymeriadau Difyr (Canolfan Peniarth, 2018)
 Cati Chwech, Cyfres Cymeriadau Difyr (Canolfan Peniarth, 2018)
 Sami Saith, Cyfres Cymeriadau Difyr (Canolfan Peniarth, 2018)
 Wali Wyth, Cyfres Cymeriadau Difyr (Canolfan Peniarth, 2018)
 Dilys Deg, Cyfres Cymeriadau Difyr (Canolfan Peniarth, 2018)
 Rhifau Coll, Cyfres Cymeriadau Difyr (Canolfan Peniarth, 2018)
 Rhifo 'Nôl ac Ymlaen, Cyfres Cymeriadau Difyr (Canolfan Peniarth, 2018)
 Dyblu, Cyfres Cymeriadau Difyr (Canolfan Peniarth, 2018)
 Odrifau ac Eilrifau, Cyfres Cymeriadau Difyr (Canolfan Peniarth, 2018)
 Fi a Joe Allen (Y Lolfa, 2018)
 Llyfr Glas Nebo (Y Lolfa, 2018), adapted for English by the author as The Blue Book of Nebo (Firefly Press/Deep Vellum, 2021)

See also 

 Welsh-language literature
 Welsh literature
 Celtic Revival
 Culture of Wales

References

External links 
 Manon Steffan Ros at Y Lolfa
 Author page at Wales Literature Exchange

1983 births
Living people
20th-century Welsh people
20th-century Welsh women
21st-century Welsh novelists
21st-century Welsh women writers
21st-century Welsh writers
People from Gwynedd
Welsh children's writers
British women children's writers
Welsh dramatists and playwrights
Welsh-language novelists
Welsh women novelists
Welsh women dramatists and playwrights
People educated at Ysgol Dyffryn Ogwen